The N. C. Wyeth House and Studio is a historic house museum and artist's studio on Murphy Road in Chadds Ford Township, Pennsylvania, United States. Beginning with its construction in 1911, it served as the principal home and studio of artist N.C. Wyeth (1882-1945). It was restored to its original appearance around the time of his death. The property is managed by the Brandywine River Museum, which offers tours. It was designated a National Historic Landmark District in 1997.

Description and history
The Wyeth House and Studio are located in a rural-residential area southeast of the village center of Chadds Ford, on the south side of Murphy Road. The property is bounded on the north by Murphy Road and the south by Brandywine Creek. The house is set on a ridge that is part of the Brandywine Battlefield area, having been occupied by Continental Army troops during the 1777 Battle of Brandywine. The house is a two-story Colonial Revival structure, designed for Wyeth by William Draper Brinkle and built in 1911. It was enlarged in 1926 to provide additional space for Wyeth's growing family. The studio is a large L-shaped single-story structure, built in stages in 1911, 1923, and 1931. The main studio space is distinguished by a large north-facing Palladian window.

N.C. Wyeth was renowned as one of the leading illustrators of the first half of the 20th century, his works appearing in Harper's, Scribner's, McClure's, and the Saturday Evening Post. Wyeth drew much inspiration from the landscape around this property, which influenced many of his rural landscape works. He purchased this property with funds made from his first major commission, a series of illustrations for an edition of Robert Louis Stevenson's Treasure Island.

After Wyeth died in 1945, his wife lived in the house until 1973, after which their daughter, Carolyn Wyeth, lived there and painted in the studio until her death in 1994. The Brandywine River Museum then took possession of the property and began restoration. It has been restored to its state as of 1945, and includes paintings left unfinished by Wyeth at the time of his death, and family artifacts that never left the property.

In 2012, N.C. Wyeth's studio was opened to the public for the first time since his death. The museum now offers guided tours of the property. Accessibility was further increased in 2017 with the opening of new walking trails between Potts Meadow, the Andrew Wyeth Studio, and the N.C. Wyeth House and Studio.

In 2019, N.C. Wyeth's grandson, Jamie, gave a tour of the illustrator's works.

See also
List of National Historic Landmarks in Pennsylvania
National Register of Historic Places listings in Delaware County, Pennsylvania

References

External links
The N. C. Wyeth House and Studio (official site). Chadds Ford, Pennsylvania: Brandywine River Museum of Art, retrieved online September 21, 2019.
Woods. Dan. "A Piece of History Discovered in the N.C. Wyeth House and Studio Tour." Andrew Wyeth Prints (non-official website providing information about Wyeth's art and life).
Wyeth, N. C., House and Studio, in National Historic Landmarks Program (archived from the original, June 6, 2011). Washington, D.C.: U.S. National Park Service, retrieved online September 21, 2019.

Houses on the National Register of Historic Places in Pennsylvania
Historic districts on the National Register of Historic Places in Pennsylvania
Houses completed in 1911
National Historic Landmarks in Pennsylvania
Museums in Delaware County, Pennsylvania
Historic house museums in Pennsylvania
Artists' studios in the United States
Wyeth, NC
Art museums and galleries in Pennsylvania
Houses in Delaware County, Pennsylvania
Wyeth family
National Register of Historic Places in Delaware County, Pennsylvania
Chadds Ford Township, Delaware County, Pennsylvania
Individually listed contributing properties to historic districts on the National Register in Pennsylvania
Wyeth